"It's a Most Unusual Day" is a popular song composed by Jimmy McHugh, with lyrics by Harold Adamson. It is considered part of the Great American Songbook. It was introduced in the film A Date With Judy, when it was sung by Jane Powell in the opening scene with the school orchestra, and is later sung in the film by Elizabeth Taylor (dubbed by Jean McLaren) and in the finale in an ensemble.

Beverly Kenney recorded "It's a Most Unusual Day" in 1957 for her album, Beverly Kenney Sings for Playboys. The song was used as the jingle for a Lincoln commercial in late 2021.

June Christy recorded "It's a Most Unusual Day" with the Stan Kenton Orchestra on 10 October 1959 for her 1960 album Road Show. It later became associated with Andy Williams who recorded it for his album Days of Wine and Roses and Other TV Requests, in 1963, which sold two million copies by the end of 1967.
Rosemary Clooney, Chris Connor for her 1958 album A Jazz Date with Chris Connor, Wesla Whitfield and Diana Panton also recorded the tune.

References

External links
Entry at Secondhandsongs.com

1948 songs
Songs with music by Jimmy McHugh
Songs with lyrics by Harold Adamson